Bonnie++ is a free software file system benchmarking tool for Unix-like operating systems, developed by Russell Coker. Bonnie++ is a benchmark suite that is aimed at performing a number of simple tests of hard drive and file system performance.

Features 
Bonnie++ allows you to benchmark how your file systems perform with respect to data read and write speed, the number of seeks that can be performed per second, and the number of file metadata operations that can be performed per second.

Sample output 
 # ./bonnie++ -u root
 Using uid:0, gid:0.
 Writing with putc()...done
 Writing intelligently...done
 Rewriting...done
 Reading with getc()...done
 Reading intelligently...done
 start 'em...done...done...done...
 Create files in sequential order...done.
 Stat files in sequential order...done.
 Delete files in sequential order...done.
 Create files in random order...done.
 Stat files in random order...done.
 Delete files in random order...done.
 Version 1.03d       ------Sequential Output------ --Sequential Input- --Random-
                     -Per Chr- --Block-- -Rewrite- -Per Chr- --Block-- --Seeks—
 Machine        Size K/sec %CP K/sec %CP K/sec %CP K/sec %CP K/sec %CP  /sec %CP
 localhost      300M  6000  40  5913   9  4213  10 10407  86 20664  20  1078  13
                     ------Sequential Create------ --------Random Create--------
                     -Create-- --Read--- -Delete-- -Create-- --Read--- -Delete—
               files  /sec %CP  /sec %CP  /sec %CP  /sec %CP  /sec %CP  /sec %CP
                  16    10  93 +++++ +++    74  63    17  90 +++++ +++    27  58
  localhost,300M,6000,40,5913,9,4213,10,10407,86,20664,20,1078.1,13,16,10,93,+++++,+++,74,63,17,90,+++++,+++,27,58

The final CSV output includes the information related to data read and write speed, number of seeks that can be performed per second, and number of file metadata operations that can be performed per second and the CPU usage statistics for the below given tests:
Create files in sequential order
Stat files in sequential order
Delete files in sequential order
Create files in random order
Stat files in random order
Delete files in random order

History

This benchmark is named Bonnie++ because it is based on the Bonnie benchmark written by Tim Bray.

See also 
Benchmark (computing)

References

External links 
 Bonnie++ home page
 Source code at SourceForge

Benchmarks (computing)
Linux file system-related software
Free software programmed in C++